Margherita Wood McCandlish (December 31, 1892 - August 25, 1954) is an American former First Lady of Guam.

Early life 
On December 31, 1892, McCandlish was born as Margherita Wilson Wood in Manhattan, New York City, New York. McCandlish's father was Franklyn Wilson Wood. McCandlish's mother was Clara Wilson Wood. McCandlish has two brothers, Ralph Frederick Wood and Franklyn Wilson Wood Jr.

Career 
In 1936, when Benjamin McCandlish was appointed as the military Governor of Guam, McCandlish became the First Lady of Guam on March 27, 1936, until February 8, 1938.

Personal life 
On June 12, 1914 in Manila, Philippine Islands, McCandlish married Benjamin Vaughan McCandlish, who later became a United States Navy officer and the 36th Naval Governor of Guam. McCandlish and her family lived in places such as Guam and near Bishopsville, South Carolina. 

McCandlish's brother Ralph Wood became an Ensign in the United States Navy, and later a Rear Admiral. 

On August 25, 1954, McCandlish died in a hospital in Hartsville, South Carolina. McCandlish is interred at Blandford Cemetery in Petersburg, Virginia. 

After McCandlish's death, her husband remarried. On October 16, 1975, McCandlish's husband died in Darlington, South Carolina. He is interred at Blandford Cemetery in Petersburg, Virginia.

References 

1892 births
1954 deaths
Burials at Blandford Cemetery
First Ladies and Gentlemen of Guam
People from Hartsville, South Carolina
People from New York City